Mother Homeland may refer to one of the following
Mother Motherland monuments in some cities of Russia and Ukraine
Mutter Heimat monument in Treptower Park, Germany